The Fayette County Courthouse in Fayetteville, Georgia was built in 1825.  It was listed on the National Register of Historic Places in 1980.

It is a brick building but was covered with gray stucco.  It has a hipped roof with a bracketed cornice.  Its tower was added in 1888; the tower's clock was installed in 1909.  The building was renovated in 1965 at cost of $70,000.

In 1980 it was the oldest courthouse in Georgia in continuous use.

References

National Register of Historic Places in Fayette County, Georgia
Second Empire architecture in Georgia (U.S. state)
Buildings and structures completed in 1825
Buildings and structures in Fayette County, Georgia
County courthouses in Georgia (U.S. state)